Niemodlin is a town in Opole County, Opole Voivodeship, Poland, with 6,315 inhabitants (2019).

History 
The community was first mentioned as Nemodlin in a 1224 deed and received town privileges in 1283. The German place-name Falkenberg was first recorded in the year 1290. Originally a part of the Duchy of Opole, after the death of Duke Bolko I, Niemodlin became the capital of a duchy in his own right from 1313 to 1382. When the Opole line of the Piast dynasty became extinct in 1532, various noble families like the Hohenzollern, the House of Zierotin, and the Prazma (German, Praschma) held the estate (also known as Falkenberg) until the 1940s.

The town of Falkenberg, after the First Silesian War in 1742, had become part of Prussia and was the capital of the Falkenberg district in the Province of Silesia. In the 18th century, Falkenberg belonged to the tax inspection region of Neustadt. In 1871, with the Prussian-led Unification of Germany, the town became part of the German Empire. After Germany's defeat in World War I, it was placed under Weimar administration. After World War II in 1945, it was placed under Polish administration. The estate's final owner, Count Frederick Leopold von Praschma, left a Renaissance castle built about 1600, which became offices for the State Repatriation Office, then served as a high school and NCO school.

Notable residents
Wilhelm Iwan (1871–1958), Lutheran pastor and historian
Otto Schwarzer (1906–1976), Wehrmacht officer

Twin towns – sister cities
See twin towns of Gmina Niemodlin.

References

External links
Jewish Community in Niemodlin on Virtual Shtetl

Cities in Silesia
Cities and towns in Opole Voivodeship
Opole County